Texacephale is a pachycephalosaurid dinosaur from the Campanian stage of the Late Cretaceous. Its fossils come from the Aguja Formation of Big Bend National Park, in Texas, and were described in 2010 by Longrich, Sankey and Tanke. The generic name means Texas + "head" (kephale in Greek) in reference to its place of discovery, and the specific name honors Wann Langston.

Discovery

The holotype specimen of Texacephale, LSUMNS 20010, is composed of fused frontals and parietals. A second specimen, LSUMNS 20012, is composed of an incomplete frontoparietal dome. It was found in the same WPA quarries that produced Agujaceratops, and may have been excavated and tossed aside, being mistaken for a rock or concretion, before being picked up decades later. According to the team, the fossilized dome of the animal possessed five to six vertical flanges on each lateral side, connecting it with the postorbital bone. The team interpreted these structures as interlocking "gears" that would help deal with stress on the bone during head-butting, a hypothetical behavior that had earlier been challenged by other authors.

Ecology
Texacephale was, like other pachycephalosaurids, a small, bipedal herbivore. The thickened dome, formed by the fused frontals and parietals, with contributions from other bones of the skull, would have meant that the brain was covered by several inches of solid bone. The dome is likely to have been used in head-butting contests over mates and/or territory, similar to modern head-butting species such as bighorn sheep, cape buffalo, and musk oxen. Damage to the skull bone may have been sustained during combat.

In contrast to today's dry, desert environment, the Big Bend paleoenvironment was a wet, coastal lowland on the edge of the Western Interior Seaway during the Campanian. Texacephale shared its environment with Agujaceratops mariscalensis, a ceratopsid. Tyrannosaurids and the giant crocodilian Deinosuchus riograndensis were also present in the Aguja environment, and were likely to have been predators.

Phylogeny
Cladogram after Longrich, Sankey and Tanke (2010).

See also

 Timeline of pachycephalosaur research

References

External links

Late Cretaceous dinosaurs of North America
Fossil taxa described in 2010
Pachycephalosaurs
Taxa named by Darren Tanke
Paleontology in Texas
Campanian genus first appearances
Campanian genus extinctions
Ornithischian genera